The Man Who Woke Up is a 1921 American short silent Western film directed by Lee Kohlmar and featuring Hoot Gibson.

Cast
 Hoot Gibson
 Charles Inslee
 Marcella Pershing
 Artie Ortego credited as Art Ortego
 Kansas Moehring

See also
 Hoot Gibson filmography

External links
 

1921 films
1921 short films
1921 Western (genre) films
American silent short films
American black-and-white films
Films directed by Lee Kohlmar
Silent American Western (genre) films
1920s American films
1920s English-language films